The Taunton River watershed or Taunton River basin is made up of  of rivers, lakes, ponds, streams, and wetlands in southeastern Massachusetts, US. It is the second largest watershed in the state. Also, it is a significant part of a much larger multi-state watershed, the Narragansett Bay watershed.

The Taunton River watershed is mostly situated in Bristol County and western Plymouth County, while some portions of it extends into parts of southern Norfolk County.

The Taunton River watershed includes:

7 species of freshwater mussels
27 different habitat types
29 species of native fish
114 species of birds. 
 of canoeable river
221 lakes and ponds
Hockomock Swamp of

Environmental advocacy 
This is an incomplete list of environmental groups and organizations that advocate protecting, by legislation and grants, the Taunton River Watershed:

Sheehan Family Foundation Grant
Taunton River Watershed Alliance
Taunton River Wild and Scenic Rivers Study

See also
List of Massachusetts rivers
Three Mile River

External links
Sheehan Family Foundation Grant Official Home Page
American Rivers site on the Taunton River.
Taunton River Stewardship Program: The Wildlands Trust of Southeastern Massachusetts Official Home Page
Taunton River Watershed Alliance Official Home Page
University of Rhode Island: Taunton River Watershed critical resource atlas.
TauntonRiver.org (The Taunton River Wild & Scenic River Study) Official Home Page
Taunton River Journal

Landforms of Bristol County, Massachusetts
Greater Taunton Area
Taunton, Massachusetts
 
Watersheds of Massachusetts

fr:Comté de Bristol (Massachusetts)